The Federal Reserve Bank of Dallas San Antonio Branch is one of three branches of the Federal Reserve Bank of Dallas.
The branch is located at 402 Dwyer, San Antonio, Texas.

Current Board of Directors
The following people are on the board of directors as of 2013:

Appointed by the Federal Reserve Bank

Appointed by the Board of Governors

See also

 Federal Reserve Act
 Federal Reserve System
 Federal Reserve Bank
 Federal Reserve Districts
 Federal Reserve Branches
 Structure of the Federal Reserve System
 Federal Reserve Bank of Dallas
 Federal Reserve Bank of Dallas El Paso Branch
 Federal Reserve Bank of Dallas Houston Branch

References

Federal Reserve branches
Buildings of the United States government in Texas